Gilchrist may refer to:

People
 Gilchrist (surname)

Places
 Gilchrist, Allegan County, Michigan
 Gilchrist, Mackinac County, Michigan
 Gilchrist, Oregon
 Gilchrist, Texas
 Gilchrist County, Florida
 Gilchrist Township, Minnesota

See also